Lee David Howells (born 14 October 1968) is a football manager and former player who played as a midfielder for Bristol Rovers and Cheltenham Town in the Football League.

He was the manager of Conference South side Bath City between 2012 and 2016. As assistant manager, he helped them gain promotion in the 2009–10 season.

References

External links

1968 births
Living people
English footballers
England semi-pro international footballers
Association football midfielders
English Football League players
National League (English football) players
Bristol Rovers F.C. players
Cheltenham Town F.C. players
Merthyr Tydfil F.C. players
Mangotsfield United F.C. players
Clevedon Town F.C. players
English football managers
Mangotsfield United F.C. managers
Bath City F.C. managers